Paros National Airport was an airport in Paros, Greece, in the Cyclades islands region. . The airport was located in the southwestern part of the island, about 10 kilometers from the port of Parikia. it was replaced by the New Paros Airport on 25 July 2016.

History
The airport was opened on October 5, 1982, on land made available by Nikolas Panteleou, hence its secondary name "Panteleou Paros Airport". Operation of the airport began as a municipal airport with a dirt runway and a small building covering 80 square meters. The year 1985 saw the construction of a paved runway. The terminal building was a single story building. In 1987 this building was renovated and an additional floor was added, housing the Hellenic Civil Aviation Authority and the MHL (Meteorological Service). In 1989, the airport became a national airport. In 2016, all operations were transferred to the new airport.

The airport has been replaced by the New Paros Airport which became fully operational on 25 July 2016. Olympic Air has undertaken to cover half of the new terminal building's budget.

Statistics
Annual passenger throughput - 13-year history

See also

Transport in Greece

References

External links
Hellenic Civil Aviation Authority - Paros Airport
Greek Airports Guide - Paros Airport
Greek Airports - Paros National Airport

Airports in Greece
Defunct airports in Greece
Buildings and structures in Paros